is a 1949 Japanese action drama film directed by Motoyoshi Oda and co-written by Akira Kurosawa, with special effects by Eiji Tsuburaya. The film has been called a "protest movie" which "portrayed a cornucopia of corruption and indicted every known example of postwar exploitation: black-marketeering, crooked politicians, blackmailing journalists, and a decaying aristocracy." Lady of Hell is regarded as one of Oda's best-known films.

Plot 

It has been three and a half years since Hiroshima and Nagasaki were bombed, and Japan's economy is no longer growing slowly due to inflation. To balance the fiscal balance, the tax authorities have organized a "T-men" squad to detect tax evasion, the biggest cause of inflation. The building is called Fujimura Sangyo and it is located in front of it. As a group of T Men are inspecting the books in the office, Yoshioka, Kano, Mihara and others are accompanied by the police; however, the double books in question are not present. A few minutes later Fujimura, the company's president, walks in and laughs meaninglessly. The economic paper's Tachibana, however, persists in his attachment to Fujimura. Former Countess Mibu and Center Party executive Nango have been dating for some time. She's also on Fujimura's radar. In the world of political parties and Fujimura Sangyo, a close relationship led to an entanglement involving Mrs Mibu, centred on "double books." Journalist Tachibana recognized the link between Nango and Fujimura Sangyo. In cooperation with Yoshioka and other members of "T Men," he began looking for the whereabouts of the double books, but Fujimura failed to reveal any evidence. Reporter Tachibana suddenly disappeared, leaving behind the news that he had captured a certain point. Major action has been initiated between the police and "T Men." Nango also suffered from money and women, like Fujimura and his friends. To gain power, Fujimura will do whatever he thinks is right. Fujimura finally takes Mrs Mibu out of Nango. Nango can't let go of Miss Mibu, but at the same time follow them to Atami, and then follow them to "T Men". A group of police officers. Fujimura's death caused Nango and Mrs Mibu to settle everything after Tachibana's murder. The "T-men" muttered, "The future is important."

Cast 

 Eitarō Ozawa as Fujimura
 Michiyo Kogure as Mrs. Mibu
 Akitake Kōno as Tachibana
 Takashi Shimura as Chief of Police
 Minoru Takada as Doi
 Shin Tokudaiji as Yoshioka
 Ichiro Ryuzaki as Nango
 Kinzō Shin as Kano
 Yasuo Hisamatsu as Mihara

Production

Crew

 Motoyoshi Oda – director
 Eiji Tsuburaya – special effects director
 Tomoyuki Tanaka – producer
 Akira Kurosawa – screenwriter
 Minoru Esaka – art director
 Akira Watanabe – special effects art director

Personnel taken from Eiga.com.

Development

The film is one of Toho's first films to use heavy special effects, the technology was then reused for the 1954 Godzilla film. The film's screenplay was co-written by Akira Kurosawa and Motosada Nishiki.

Release

Theatrical 
Lady from Hell was released in Japan on March 15, 1949, where it was distributed by Toho.

Home media 
Asahi Shimbun Publishing – DVD

 Released: October 21, 2019
 Audio: Japanese
 Subtitles: Japanese
 Discs: 1
 Extras:
 Still gallery
 Theatrical poster

References

Sources

External links 
 
 

1949 drama films
1949 films
Films with screenplays by Akira Kurosawa
Japanese black-and-white films
Films directed by Motoyoshi Oda
Japanese action drama films
1940s action drama films
1940s Japanese-language films